Brian Johnson (born April 1, 1960 in Montreal, Quebec) is a  Canadian retired professional ice hockey right winger who played one season in the National Hockey League for the Detroit Red Wings.

Johnson spent four seasons in the Quebec Major Junior Hockey League with the Verdun/Sorel Éperviers and the Sherbrooke Beavers before signing with the Detroit Red Wings in 1980.  He had spells in the American Hockey League with the Adirondack Red Wings and the Central Hockey League with the Dallas Black Hawks before making his debut for Detroit during the 1983-84 NHL season, playing a total of three regular season games, going pointless with five penalty minutes.  After spells with the Carolina Thunderbirds and the Indianapolis Checkers, Johnson retired in 1986.

On April 16, 2012, Brian Johnson was sentenced to 4 years in prison for trafficking cocaine in Saint John, New Brunswick.

Career statistics

References

External links

1960 births
Living people
Adirondack Red Wings players
Black Canadian ice hockey players
Canadian ice hockey right wingers
Carolina Thunderbirds players
Dallas Black Hawks players
Detroit Red Wings players
Sherbrooke Castors players
Ice hockey people from Montreal
Indianapolis Checkers players
Undrafted National Hockey League players